Azneftyağ Baku FK was an Azerbaijani football club from Baku founded in 1991, as Taraggi Baku, and dissolved in 1993 as Azneftyag Baku.

They participated in the Azerbaijan Top Division during the 1992 season as Taraggi Baku, finishing 9th, and changed their name to Azneftyag Baku for the 1993 seasons, finishing 19th. They dissolved after the 1993–94 Azerbaijan First Division season in which they won Group B before losing out on promotion in the playoffs.

League and domestic cup history

References 

Football clubs in Azerbaijan
Association football clubs established in 1991
Defunct football clubs in Azerbaijan
1991 establishments in Azerbaijan